The 1988–89 Washington Huskies men's basketball team represented the University of Washington for the 1988–89 NCAA Division I men's basketball season. Led by fourth-year head coach Andy Russo, the Huskies were members of the Pacific-10 Conference and played their home games on campus at Hec Edmundson Pavilion in Seattle, Washington.

In the Pac-10 tournament in southern California at The Forum, Washington lost to third seed UCLA by ten points in the quarterfinal.

Russo resigned less than two weeks later, and was succeeded by alumnus Lynn Nance, the head coach at Saint Mary's.  were WCAC champions, received an at-large berth in the NCAA tournament, and finished at 

This season's Final Four was held in Seattle at the Kingdome.

Postseason results

|-
!colspan=5 style=| Pacific-10 Tournament

References

External links
Sports Reference – Washington Huskies: 1988–89 basketball season

Washington Huskies men's basketball seasons
Washington Huskies
Washington
Washington